Gudivada or Peddapuram is a  village in Peddapuram Mandal, East Godavari district of Andhra Pradesh.

It is one of the areas where special teams appointed by Superintendent of Police M Ravindranath Babu and his team conducted raids where crores of rupees allegedly changed hands for illegal cockfighting.

References

Villages in East Godavari district